Thekla (Tekla) Johanna Virginia Hultin (18 April 1864 – 31 March 1943 in Helsinki) was a Finnish journalist, politician and feminist. She was the second woman to receive a doctorate in Finland, and the first to be awarded a Ph.D.

Biography 
Tekla Hultin was born in Jaakkima (modern-day Russia) to a family of five children. She attended school in Sortavala and later to a private girls school in Viipuri. She studied in Helsinki and became a teacher in 1885.

In 1886, Hultin began her university studies. She studied (among others) literature, art history and psychology, but specialized in history. In spring 1891, she received her Master's degree and became a journalist with the Helsinki newspaper .

In 1896, Hultin defended her history thesis. She then focused her efforts on political action. She published books for Suomalaisuuden herätys and wrote (among others) the biography of Leo Mechelin. In 1901, Hultin was named the second actuary for Statistics Finland's main office.

In her journal, Hultin described historical events of the era and the general feeling of the Finnish public on the events. The victory of the Japanese over the Russians in the Russo-Japanese War laid the foundation for protests, riots and the 1905 general strike in Finland against Russian occupation.

Political life 
Hultin was one of the founders of the Young Finnish Party and became a journalist for Päivälehti, the official newspaper of the party (1893–1901) and in 1900 for Isänmaan Ystävä. As the first leader of the Finnish Women's Union, Hultin worked with Leo Mechelin to ensure Women's suffrage in Finland.

Hultin served as a Member of Parliament for the Western Electoral District of Viipuri Province from 1908 to 1924.  She originally represented the Young Finnish Party and later joined the National Coalition Party when the former dissolved. After her time in parliament, Hultin served on the Helsinki City Council from 1925–1930.

Publications

Books 

 
 
 
 Mikä on perustuslaki?, vuoropuhelua lautamiehen tuvassa, Tekla Johanna Virginia Hultin ; kirj. T. H. – Erkko Johan Henrik. 15 s., Otava, 1899.
 Mistä on kysymys?, 22 s., Nuorsuomalaisen puolueen kanslia, 1909.
 Naisasia Pienpainateaineisto, 1810–1944.
 Perustuslaillinen hallitus ja suomettarelainen hallitus, esitelmä pidetty nuorsuomalaisten kokouksissa syksyllä 1906, 24 s., 1906.
 
 
 Suomen asema Venäjän valtakunnassa. 19 s., WSOY,1908 Suomalaisen naisliiton kirjasia; 3
 
 Undersökning rörande nattarbeterskorna i Finlands industrier ; på uppdrag af Kejserliga Senaten och under dess öfverinseende värkstäld. X, 85, 49 s. s., Edlundska Bokhandeln, 1911. Arbetsstatistik; XI
 Vielä kerran suomettarelainen hallitus, vastaus sen nimettömälle asianajajalle. 32., Nuorsuomalaisen puolueen kanslia, 1907.
 Yötyöntekijättäret Suomen teollisuudessa, tutkimus Keisarillisen Suomen Senaatin määräyksestä ja Teollisuushallituksen ylivalvonnan alaisena. X, 85, 49 s. 1911. Työtilastoa; 11

Translations 

 Gustaf Alexander Cygnæus: K. Suomen talousseura 1797–1897, toimikunnan toimesta kuvailtu. Suomennoksen suoritti Tekla Hultin. 1897.
 
 Suomen matkailija-yhdistys: Vuoksi, lyhyitä neuvoja Vuoksen-retkiä varten Imatralta Käkisalmeen ynnä kartta. Toim. Aug. Ramsay; suom. Tekla Hultin. Wasenius’en kirjakauppa, 1892.
 Ukko-Pekka, kansan mies, tammikuun 5 p:nä 1937. Toim. Erkki Räikkönen, E. A. Fabritius, Tekla Hultin. Sanatar, 1937.

References 

1864 births
People from Lakhdenpokhsky District
1943 deaths
Finnish journalists
Finnish schoolteachers
Finnish feminists
University of Helsinki alumni
Members of the Parliament of Finland (1908–09)
Members of the Parliament of Finland (1909–10)
Members of the Parliament of Finland (1910–11)
Members of the Parliament of Finland (1911–13)
Members of the Parliament of Finland (1913–16)
Members of the Parliament of Finland (1916–17)
Members of the Parliament of Finland (1917–19)
Members of the Parliament of Finland (1919–22)
Members of the Parliament of Finland (1922–24)
Women members of the Parliament of Finland
Finnish city councillors
Articles with missing Wikidata information